Stratford (strictly the Stratford Division of West Ham) was a parliamentary constituency in the Borough of West Ham in the South-West of Essex (now East London), which returned one Member of Parliament (MP) to the House of Commons of the Parliament of the United Kingdom, elected by the first-past-the-post voting system.

The constituency was created for the 1918 general election and abolished for the 1950 general election.

Members of Parliament

Elections

Election in the 1940s

Elections in the 1930s

Elections in the 1920s

Elections in the 1910s

References 

Parliamentary constituencies in London (historic)
Constituencies of the Parliament of the United Kingdom established in 1918
Constituencies of the Parliament of the United Kingdom disestablished in 1950
Politics of the London Borough of Newham